KMBY may refer to:

 KMBY (AM), a radio station (1240 AM) licensed to serve Monterey, California, United States
 KMBY-LD, a low-power digital television station (channel 19) licensed to serve Templeton, California
 KDFG, a radio station (103.9 FM) licensed to serve Seaside, California, which used the call sign KMBY-FM from September 2002 to February 2008
 KHIP, a radio station (104.3 FM) licensed to serve Gonzales, California, which used the call sign KMBY-FM from November 1995 to September 2002
 KSES-FM, a radio station (107.1 FM) licensed to serve Seaside, California, which used the call sign KMBY-FM from September 1993 to July 1994
 Omar N. Bradley Airport (ICAO code KMBY)